Cloudy with a Chance of Meatballs is a media franchise produced by  Sony Pictures Animation and loosely based on the book of the same name by Judi Barrett. The films have received generally positive reviews from critics. The series has grossed $517 million at the box office.

Feature films

Cloudy with a Chance of Meatballs (2009)

Cloudy with a Chance of Meatballs 2 (2013)

Television series

Cloudy with a Chance of Meatballs (2017–2018)

On October 9, 2014, DHX Media announced that it would develop and produce a television series based on the film franchise, titled Cloudy with a Chance of Meatballs, released on March 6, 2017 in the United States and April 6 of the same year in Canada. The series is traditionally animated and consists of 26 22-minute episodes. It takes place before the first film, showing Flint Lockwood as a high school student who dreams to become a serious scientist. In his adventures, he is joined by Sam Sparks, a new girl in town and the school's "wannabe" reporter, along with Flint's dad Tim, Steve the Monkey, Manny as the head of the school's audiovisual club, Earl as a school gym teacher, Brent as a baby wear model, and mayor Shelbourne. DHX Media handles the global television and non-US home entertainment distribution, along with worldwide merchandising rights, while Sony distributes home entertainment in the US. Commissioned by Teletoon in Canada, the series airs on Cartoon Network in the United States, and on the Boomerang channel in other territories.

Short films

Super Manny
Super Manny is a  short film, released in October 26, 2013.

Earl Scouts
Earl Scouts is a  short film, released on  October 26, 2013.

Steve's First Bath
Steve's First Bath was released on January 28, 2014.

Attack of the 50-Foot Gummi Bear
Attack of the 50-Foot Gummi Bear was released on January 28, 2014.

Cast and characters
 A dark gray cell indicates the character did not appear in that installment.
 A  indicates an actor or actress voiced a younger version of their character.

 A dark gray cell indicates the character does not appear.

Crew

Reception

Box office performance

Critical response

References

External links

 
Film franchises introduced in 2009
English-language films
Fantasy film franchises
Animated film series
Comedy film franchises
Children's film series
Columbia Pictures franchises
Sony Pictures Animation franchises